Stephanie Vogt was the defending champion, but lost in the first round to Karin Knapp.

Knapp then went on to win the title, defeating Jesika Malečková in the final, 6–1, 6–2.

Seeds

Main draw

Finals

Top half

Bottom half

References 
 Main draw

Internazionali Femminili di Brescia - Singles